"Gimme Some Slack" is a song by the American rock band the Cars from the album Panorama. The song was written by bandleader Ric Ocasek.

Lyrics and music
The lyrics to "Gimme Some Slack" have a more concrete basis than many songs written by Ocasek.  They are influenced by Ocasek's memories of the apartment building on the Lower East Side of Manhattan in which he lived in the early 1970s.  Ocasek stated that "I remember people hanging clothes out on the roof and having all kinds of dirt in the hallway.  So I'd think 'gimme some slack, gimme some rope, please.'"  Jonathan Takiff of the Philadelphia Daily News points out that "Gimme Some Slack" and "Touch and Go" are examples of a "subtle, philosophical of first person survival" that represents an alternative side of the Cars from the "lost and frantic new age romantic" side exposed in songs like "Candy-O" and "Just What I Needed."

Stuart Mungalies of The News states that "Gimme Some Slack" sounds like a combination of the Rolling Stones and Devo.  Jim Bohen of the Daily Record describes the music as starting with "revved up rhythm guitar" but then having a refrain on which it is difficult to find the groove.  Cars keyboardist Greg Hawkes plays both organ and saxophone on "Gimme Some Slack."

Release and reception
"Gimme Some Slack" was first released on Panorama, but in 1981, the song was released as the third single from said album. However, the song failed to chart in any countries, making it one of the band's least successful singles. The song has since appeared on the compilation album Just What I Needed: The Cars Anthology.

Record World said that "the band hits a rhythm gallop over a steady dance beat" and that the song has "contagious keyboards."

In his review of Panorama, AllMusic reviewer Greg Prato stated "'Gimme Some Slack' proved to be a fierce rocker." Prato also said, in his review of Just What I Needed: The Cars Anthology, that it was "previously released album tracks [on the album]" that were "highlights." In the Just What I Needed: The Cars Anthology liner notes, Brett Milano said, "Rockers like 'Getting Through' and 'Gimme Some Slack' had a heavier sound than before [Panorama]."

Boston Globe critic Steve Morse called "Gimme Some Slack" a "true masterpiece."  Morse praises how the song "paints a seedily phantasmic portrait of a tenement building" with the lines "the seven floors of walkup/the odor musted cracks/the peeping keyhole intorverts/with the monkeys on their backs/the rooftops strung with frauleins/the pastel pinned up sails/the eighteen color roses/against your face so pale."  Morse suggests that the stream of consciousness style of the song was influenced by E.E. Cummings, Lawrence Ferlinghetti and Richard Brautigan.

B-side
The B-side of the song, "Don't Go to Pieces", features Benjamin Orr on lead vocals. "Don't Go to Pieces" was first released as the B-side to "Don't Tell Me No", the single released before "Gimme Some Slack".

References

External links
 https://www.youtube.com/watch?v=mAyjRc9qffM
 https://www.youtube.com/watch?v=SXC_-GO9wIQ
 Lyric's to "Don't Go To Pieces."

1981 singles
Songs written by Ric Ocasek
The Cars songs
1980 songs
Song recordings produced by Roy Thomas Baker
Elektra Records singles